Der er et yndigt land is a 1983 Danish drama film directed by Morten Arnfred. It was entered into the 33rd Berlin International Film Festival, where it won an Honourable Mention.

Cast 
 Ole Ernst as Knud
  as Katrine
 Anna Vallgårda as Anna
 Ricki Rasmussen as Søren
  as Vilhelm
  as Poul
  as Tom
 Gyrd Løfquist as Willy
  as Estrid
  as Svineavlskonsulenten Bjarne
  as Bankbestyrer
  as Karlsen
  as Svend
  as Inga
  as Dyrlæge
  as Dyrlægen

Accolades 
The film won the 1983 Bodil Award for Best Danish Film.

References

External links 
 

1983 drama films
1983 films
Danish drama films
1980s Danish-language films
Films directed by Morten Arnfred
Best Danish Film Bodil Award winners